Luis Miguel Quiñones (born 3 January 2001) is a Colombian weightlifter. He won the silver medal in the men's +109kg event at the 2022 South American Games held in Asunción, Paraguay.

He won the gold medal in the men's 109kg event at the 2021 Junior Pan American Games held in Colombia.

Achievements

References

External links 
 

Living people
2001 births
Place of birth missing (living people)
Colombian male weightlifters
South American Games silver medalists for Colombia
South American Games medalists in weightlifting
Competitors at the 2022 South American Games
21st-century Colombian people